The Nepton River North is a tributary of the Nepton River (Chibougamau Lake), flowing into the Municipality of Eeyou Istchee Baie-James, in Jamésie, in the administrative region of Nord-du-Québec, in the province of Quebec, to Canada.

The course of the river flows entirely into McCorkill Township.

The hydrographic slope of the "Nepton River North" is accessible by a forest road serving the eastern side of Chibougamau Lake; this the last is connected by the North to route 167 which also serves the south side of Waconichi Lake and the Waconichi River. This last road comes from Chibougamau, going north-east to the south-eastern part of Mistassini Lake.

The surface of the "Nepton North River" is usually frozen from early November to mid-May, however, safe ice circulation is usually from mid-November to mid-April.

Geography

Toponymy 
The toponym "Nepton River North" was formalized on December 5, 1968, at the Commission de toponymie du Québec, i.e. at the founding of this commission.

References

See also 

Rivers of Nord-du-Québec
Nottaway River drainage basin
Eeyou Istchee James Bay